Battle of the Ex Besties is a reality competition show that premiered on Oxygen on February 14, 2017. The series featured 7 pairs of former best friends competing together to win a $100,000 prize. The cast included former Bad Girls Club cast members Danni Victor and Judi JaI.

Contestants

Weekly progress

Table key
 The team won the final competition
 The team lost the final competition
 The team won first place in that week's challenge
 The team did not have to compete that week's challenge
 The team was in danger of being eliminated
 The team was eliminated from the competition
 The team was originally eliminated, but was saved

Notes

Episodes

References

2010s American reality television series
2017 American television series debuts
2017 American television series endings
Oxygen (TV channel) original programming